Robert Craig Jansen van Vuuren (born 26 March 1976) is a South African comedian, actor, presenter, theatre maker, and writer.

Early life
Van Vuuren was born in Port Elizabeth. He completed his matriculation at Maritzburg College before going on to graduate with a degree in Drama from Rhodes University in 1997. During university, he joined the First Physical Theatre Company.

Career
Van Vuuren began his career in theatre, receiving Vita and Fleur du Cap Theatre Award nominations for his roles in the productions Birdy and The Beauty Queen of Leenane respectively.

Forming a comedy and creative duo with Louw Venter, van Vuuren produced and played Twakkie in YouTube videos and later in the SABC2 sketch comedy series The Most Amazing Show from 2006 to 2007. Venter played Corné. The duo also took these personas on a live tour. During this time, van Vuuren presented Crazy Games, also for SABC2 and starred in the comedy film Footskating 101 as Vince Muldoon.

Van Vuuren and his dance partner Mary Martin won the fifth season of Strictly Come Dancing in 2008. That same year, he wrote and performed his first stand up comedy show Rob van Vuuren is Ron van Wuren, which received a South African Comedy Award nomination and picked up the Nando's Breakthrough Act Award at the National Arts Festival that year. Through Juju Productions, he directed a number of plays. He was invited by Brett Bailey to perform at Nelson Mandela's 90th birthday party in Qunu. Van Vuuren went on to co-host the first two seasons of SA's Got Talent with Anele Mdoda.

In 2011, Van Vuuren received the inaugural Comics' Choice Breakthrough Act Award for his work in comedy and has since gone on to win five Standard Bank Ovation Awards at the annual National Arts Festival. He has also taken his comedy shows abroad the likes of London, Brighton, Edinburgh, Perth, Amsterdam, Dubai, and Sharjah.

Van Vuuren starred opposite Siv Ngesi in the 2012 crime comedy film Copposites. He, Ngesi, and Danielle Bischoff created the children's book series Florence & Watson as well as it accompanying stage show.

In 2016, van Vuuren and Bontle Modiselle co-hosted the competition series Showville. That year, he starred in a production of A Doll's House, for which he received a number of accolades including a Fleur du Cap Theatre Award.

Van Vuuren starred as the titular role in the 2017 comedy film Van der Merwe, reuniting with Venter, who played his brother. The following year, he appeared in the film Tremors: A Cold Day in Hell. He earned three Fleur du Cap nominations in 2018 and 2019 for his roles in Louis Viljoen's Dangled as well as the Baxter Theatre productions of Endgame and Curse of the Starving Class.

Van Vuuren joined the main cast of the 2020 Netflix crime drama Queen Sono as Viljoen. The following year, he played Russ Thorn in the 2021 Slumber Party Massacre remake and starred as Mr Angelo in the SABC1 drama miniseries The Kingdom.

Van Vuuren embarked on a new comedy show in 2022 titled Rob van Vuuren is Still Standing at Cafe Roux.

Personal life
Van Vuuren was married to Danielle Bischoff, with whom he collaborated on Juju Productions and Florence & Watson, from 2008 until sometime during lockdown. Van Vuuren and Bischoff had lived in Fish Hoek with their daughter, whom they adopted.

Upon Showmax's 2020 decision to review content on its platform, van Vuuren issued an official apology for having engaged in blackface for a 2013 Leon Schuster film.

Filmography

Film

Television

Stage

Theatre

Stand up

Awards and nominations

References

External links
 
 Rob van Vuuren at TVSA
 Rob van Vuuren at Artistes Personal Management
 Florence & Watson website

Living people
1976 births
21st-century South African male actors
People from Port Elizabeth
Alumni of Maritzburg College
Rhodes University alumni
South African male comedians
South African male stage actors
South African television personalities
Strictly Come Dancing winners